The 1918 Kansas Jayhawks football team represented the University of Kansas as a member of the Missouri Valley Conference (MVC) during the 1918 college football season. In their first and only season under head coach Jay Bond, the Jayhawks compiled a record of  2–2 record and were outscored by opponents by a combined total of 66 to 33. Due to events related to World War I and the 1918 flu pandemic, the Missouri Valley Conference did not schedule any official conference games, recorded no standings, and awarded no title for 1918. The 1918 Kansas team played its home games at McCook Field in Lawrence, Kansas. Lewis Foster was the team captain.

Schedule
Season was shortened due to the Spanish flu pandemic.

References

Kansas
Kansas Jayhawks football seasons
Kansas Jayhawks football